Decade One is a compilation album by Babyland, released in 2001 by Dependent Records. As the title suggest, the album compiles tracks drawn from the band's first ten years of recording.

Track listing

Personnel 
Adapted from the Decade One liner notes.

Babyland
 Dan Gatto – lead vocals, keyboards
 Michael Smith – percussion

Design
 Aartvark – cover art

Release history

References

External links 
 Decade One at Discogs (list of releases)
 Decade One at Bandcamp

2001 compilation albums
Babyland albums
Dependent Records compilation albums